Adal (Harari: አዳል), known as Awdal or Aw Abdal was a historical Muslim region in the Horn of Africa. Located towards the Harar plateau east of Ifat.

Geography 

Adal was situated east of the province of Ifat and was a general term for a region inhabited by Muslims. According to Portuguese explorer Francisco Alvarez, Adal in 1520 bordered on the Abyssinian frontier province of Fatagar in the west and stretched to Cape Guardafui in the east. He further stated that it was confined by the kingdom of Afar in the north west and that the leaders of Adal were considered saints by the locals for their warfare with neighboring Abyssinia.

It was used ambiguously in the medieval era to indicate the Muslim inhabitant low land portion east of the Ethiopian Empire. Including north of the Awash River towards Lake Abbe in modern Ethiopia Djibouti border as well as the territory between Shewa and Zeila on the coast of Somaliland. Districts within Adal included Hubat, Gidaya and Hargaya. It also occasionally included the Hadiya Sultanate.

According to Ewald Wagner, Adal region was historically the area stretching from Zeila to Harar. In the 1800s Catholic missionary Stanely states Adal is situated west of Zaila. Dr. Duri Mohammed asserts the lowlands outside the city of Harar is known as Aw Abdal where Imams traditionally led prayer. According to Amélie Chekroun, Adal designated the region east of the Awash River, replacing Ifat as the Muslim power which had come under Ethiopian Christian control in the 1300s. The Christian state under Menelik II's invasion during the 1800s for the first time in its history maintained control in Adal therefore incorporating it into modern Ethiopia.

Semi legendary foundation

Eidal (Abdal) becomes Emir of the region succeeding saint Barkhadle in AD 1067 following a victory against a Persian.

History 
 
Earliest reference to Adal is in 1288 shortly before the collapse of the Makhzumi dynasty when the region was invaded by Sultan Walasma of Ifat. Adal is also mentioned by Marco Polo in 1295 as a state continuously in conflict with Abyssinia. According to fourteenth century Arab historian Al Umari, Adal was one of the founding regions of the Ifat Sultanate. In the fourteenth century Emperor Amda Seyon of Ethiopia battled against Adal leader Imam Salih who allied with Jamal ad-Din I of Ifat.

In the late fourteenth century rebel leaders of Ifat Haqq ad-Din II and Sa'ad ad-Din II relocated their base to the Harari plateau in Adal forming a new Sultanate. This new Adal Sultanate encompassed the modern city of Harar. According to Arabic texts Coffee was introduced into Arabia by the Arab brother in-law of Sa'ad ad-Din II, Ali bin Omar al-Shadhili which he became familiar with during his brief stay in Adal.

According to Enrico Cerulli, local discontent for the Walasma dynasty of Ifat which occupied Adal region led to the rise of Ahmed ibn Ibrahim al-Ghazi in the sixteenth century. Up until the end of the sixteenth century, the rulers of Adal were in a raging conflict with the leaders of neighboring Christian state of Ethiopian Empire. In the ensuing Oromo invasions, Adal split into two states, the Aussa Sultanate of Adal and Harar Emirate of
Adal, the latter surviving up until the nineteenth century. In 1842 British traveler Charles Johnston described Harar as the last city of Adal.

In the 1900s the designated emperor of Ethiopia Lij Iyasu is stated to have entered into marriage alliances with the peoples of Adal. Iyasu married the daughter of a Somali noble, the daughter of an Afar descended from the governor of Zeila as well as the daughter of Abdullahi Sadiq, a Harari aristocrat.

Inhabitants

Clans of Adal mentioned in the fourteenth century Emperor Amda Seyon chronicles during the Ethiopian invasion included; Wargar, Tiqo, Paguma, Labakala and Gabala. 

In the fifteenth century Emperor Zara Yaqob chronicle, the Harla people are mentioned as the traders of Adal. Harla are considered to be the main population of Adal. However, according to historian Enrico Cerulli, Harla people who originate from the Harari region were assimilated by Somalis following the decline of the Adal principalities.

According to Professor Lapiso, the contemporary Harari people are heirs to the ancient Semitic speaking peoples of the Adal region. Historians state the language spoken by the people of Adal as well as its rulers the Imams and Sultans would closely resemble contemporary Harari language. According to Bahru Zewde the Walasma state of Adal in the fourteenth century primarily included the Semitic speaking Harari and Argobba people, however it also began including some portions of Somali and Afar people. The agriculture practicing population of Adal were exclusively Harla and Harari people.

According to Archaeologist Jorge Rodriguez, the Somalis were periphery peoples of the Adal state.

Gallery

References

Medieval Ethiopia
History of Ethiopia